is a Japanese football player who currently plays for the J3 League team Nagano Parceiro.

Career statistics
Updated to 23 February 2017.

J-League Firsts
 Appearance: April 14, 2007. Yokohama F Marinos 5 vs 0 Ōita Trinita, Nissan Stadium

Honours
Yokohama F. Marinos
Emperor's Cup: 2013

References

External links

Profile at Yokohama F. Marinos 
Profile at Nagano Parceiro

1986 births
Living people
Association football people from Kanagawa Prefecture
Japanese footballers
J1 League players
J2 League players
J3 League players
Yokohama F. Marinos players
JEF United Chiba players
AC Nagano Parceiro players
Association football defenders